The 3rd annual Berlin International Film Festival was held from 18 to 28 June 1953.

Description
This year's festival did not give any official jury prizes; instead awards were given by audience voting. This continued until the FIAPF granted Berlin "A-Status" in 1956.

The Golden Bear was awarded to Le Salaire de la peur by audience vote. It was at this edition that the first replica of the Bär first created by sculptor Renée Sintenis, produced by the Noack Foundry, was presented.

The festival held a retrospective on silent films.

Films in competition
The following films were in competition for the Golden Bear award:

Key
{| class="wikitable" width="550" colspan="1"
| style="background:#FFDEAD;" align="center"| †
|Winner of the main award for best film in its section
|}

Awards
The following prizes were awarded by audience votes:
 Golden Bear: Le Salaire de la peur by Henri-Georges Clouzot
 Silver Bear: Magia verde by Gian Gaspare Napolitano
 Bronze Berlin Bear: Sie fanden eine Heimat by Leopold Lindtberg

References

External links
 3rd  Berlin International Film Festival 1953
1953 Berlin International Film Festival
Berlin International Film Festival:1953  at Internet Movie Database

03
1953 film festivals
1953 in West Germany
1950s in Berlin